Islamic cosmology is the cosmology of Islamic societies. It is mainly derived from the Qur'an, Hadith, Sunnah, and current Islamic as well as other pre-Islamic sources. The Qur'an itself mentions seven heavens.

Metaphysical principles

Duality
In Islamic thought the cosmos includes both the Unseen Universe and the Observable Universe (Alam-al-Shahood). Nevertheless, both belong to the created universe. Islamic dualism does not constitute between spirit and matter, but between Creator (God) and creation. The latter including both the seen and unseen.

Sufi cosmology

Sufi cosmology is a general term for cosmological doctrines associated with the mysticism of Sufism. These may differ from place to place, order to order and time to time, but overall show the influence of several different cosmographies:

The Quran's testament concerning God and immaterial beings, the soul and the afterlife, the beginning and end of things, the seven heavens etc.
The Neoplatonic views cherished by Islamic philosophers like Avicenna and Ibn Arabi.
The Hermetic-Ptolemaic spherical geocentric world.
The Ishraqi visionary universe as expounded by Suhrawardi Maqtul.

Quranic interpretations 
There are several verses in the Qur'an (610–632) which some medieval and modern writers have reinterpreted as foreshadowing modern cosmological theories. An early example of this can be seen in the work of the Islamic theologian Fakhr al-Din al-Razi (1149–1209), in dealing with his conception of physics and the physical world in his Matalib. He discusses Islamic cosmology, criticizes the idea of the Earth's centrality within the universe, and explores "the notion of the existence of a multiverse in the context of his commentary" on the Qur'anic verse, "All praise belongs to God, Lord of the Worlds." He raises the question of whether the term "worlds" in this verse refers to "multiple worlds within this single universe or cosmos, or to many other universes or a multiverse beyond this known universe." He rejects the Aristotelian view of a single world or universe in favour of the existence of multiple worlds and universes, a view that he believed to be supported by the Qur'an and by the Ash'ari theory of atomism.

Cosmology in the medieval Islamic world

Cosmology was studied extensively in the Muslim world during what is known as the Islamic Golden Age from the 7th to 15th centuries. There are exactly seven verses in the Quran that specify that there are seven heavens, "He it is who created for you all that is in the earth; then he turned towards the heavens, and he perfected them as seven heavens; and he has perfect knowledge of all things."
One verse says that each heaven or sky has its own order, possibly meaning laws of nature. Another verse says after mentioning the seven heavens "and similar earths".

In 850, al-Farghani wrote Kitab fi Jawani ("A compendium of the science of stars"). The book primarily gave a summary of Ptolemic cosmography. However, it also corrected Ptolemy's Almagest based on findings of earlier Iranian astronomers. Al-Farghani gave revised values for the obliquity of the ecliptic, the precessional movement of the apogees of the sun and the moon, and the circumference of the earth. The books were widely circulated through the Muslim world, and even translated into Latin.

Cosmography
Islamic historian Michael Cook states that the "basic structure" of the Islamic universe according to scholars interpretation of the verses of the Quran and Islamic traditions was of seven heavens above seven earths. 
"Allah is He Who Created seven firmaments and of the earth a similar number. Through the midst of them (all) descends His command: that ye may know that Allah has power over all things, and that Allah comprehends all things In (His) Knowledge." 

The seven earths formed parallel layers with human beings inhabiting the top layer and Satan dwelling at the bottom. The seven heavens also formed parallel layers; the lowest level being the sky we see from earth and the highest being paradise (Jannah).  Other traditions describes the seven heavens as each having a notable prophet in residence that Muhammad visits during Miʿrāj: Moses (Musa) on the sixth heaven, Abraham (Ibrahim) on the seventh heaven, etc.

ʿAjā'ib al-makhlūqāt wa gharā'ib al-mawjūdāt (meaning Marvels of creatures and Strange things existing) is an important work of cosmography by Zakariya ibn Muhammad ibn Mahmud Abu Yahya al-Qazwini who was born in Qazwin year 600 (AH (1203 AD).

Temporal finitism

In contrast to ancient Greek philosophers who believed that the universe had an infinite past with no beginning, medieval philosophers and theologians developed the concept of the universe having a finite past with a beginning (see Temporal finitism).  The Christian philosopher, John Philoponus, presented the first such argument against the ancient Greek notion of an infinite past. His arguments were adopted by many most notably; early Muslim philosopher, Al-Kindi (Alkindus); the Jewish philosopher, Saadia Gaon (Saadia ben Joseph); and the Muslim theologian, Al-Ghazali (Algazel). They used two logical arguments against an infinite past, the first being the "argument from the impossibility of the existence of an actual infinite", which states:

"An actual infinite cannot exist."
"An infinite temporal regress of events is an actual infinite."
"∴ An infinite temporal regress of events cannot exist."

The second argument, the "argument from the impossibility of completing an actual infinite by successive addition", states:

"An actual infinite cannot be completed by successive addition."
"The temporal series of past events has been completed by successive addition."
"∴ The temporal series of past events cannot be an actual infinite."

Both arguments were adopted by later Christian philosophers and theologians, and the second argument in particular became more famous after it was adopted by Immanuel Kant in his thesis of the first antinomy concerning time.

Amount of time
The Quran states that the universe was created in six ayyam (days), in verse 50:38 among others. According to verse 70:4, one day in Quran is equal to 50,000 years on Earth. Therefore, Muslims interpret the description of a "six days" creation as six distinct periods or eons. The length of these periods is not precisely defined, nor are the specific developments that took place during each period.

According to Michael Cook "early Muslim scholars" believed the amount of finite time creation had been assigned was about "six or seven thousand years" and that perhaps all but 500 years or so  had already passed. He quotes a tradition of Muhammad saying "in reference to the prospective duration" of the community of the Muslim companions: `Your appointed time compared with that of those who were before you is as from the afternoon prayer (Asr prayer) to the setting of the sun'". Early Muslim Ibn Ishaq estimated the prophet Noah lived 1200 years after Adam was expelled from paradise, the prophet Abraham 2342 years after Adam, Moses 2907 years, Jesus 4832 years and Muhammad 5432 years.

The Fatimid thinker al-Mu’ayyad fi’l-Din al-Shirazi (d. 1078) shares his own views about the creation of the world in 6 days. He rebukes the idea of the creation of the world in 6 cycles of either 24 hours, 1000 or 50,000 years, and instead questions both how creation can be measured in units of time when time was yet to be created, as well as how an infinitely powerful creator can be limited by the constraints of time, as it is itself part of his own creation. The Ismaili thinker Nasir Khusraw (d. after 1070) expands on his colleague’s work. He writes that these days refer to cycles of creation demarcated by the arrival of God’s messengers (ṣāḥibān-i adwār), culminating in the arrival of the Lord of the Resurrection (Qāʾim al-Qiyāma), when the world will come out of darkness and ignorance and “into the light of her Lord” (Quran 39:69). His era, unlike that of the enunciators of divine revelation (nāṭiqs) before him, is not one where God prescribes the people to work. Rather, his is an era of reward for those “who laboured in fulfilment of (the Prophets') command and with knowledge”.

Galaxy observation
The Arab astronomer Alhazen (965–1037) made the first attempt at observing and measuring the Milky Way's parallax, and he thus "determined that because the Milky Way had no parallax, it was very remote from the earth and did not belong to the atmosphere."  The Persian astronomer Abū Rayhān al-Bīrūnī (973–1048) proposed the Milky Way galaxy to be "a collection of countless fragments of the nature of nebulous stars." The Andalusian astronomer Ibn Bajjah ("Avempace", d. 1138) proposed that the Milky Way was made up of many stars which almost touched one another and appeared to be a continuous image due to the effect of refraction from sublunary material, citing his observation of the conjunction of Jupiter and Mars on 500 AH (1106/1107 AD) as evidence. Ibn Qayyim Al-Jawziyya (1292–1350) proposed the Milky Way galaxy to be "a myriad of tiny stars packed together in the sphere of the fixed stars".

In the 10th century, the Persian astronomer Abd al-Rahman al-Sufi (known in the West as Azophi) made the earliest recorded observation of the Andromeda Galaxy, describing it as a "small cloud". Al-Sufi also identified the Large Magellanic Cloud, which is visible from Yemen, though not from Isfahan; it was not seen by Europeans until Magellan's voyage in the 16th century. These were the first galaxies other than the Milky Way to be observed from Earth. Al-Sufi published his findings in his Book of Fixed Stars in 964.

Possible worlds
Al-Ghazali, in The Incoherence of the Philosophers, defends the Ash'ari doctrine of a created universe that is temporally finite, against the Aristotelian doctrine of an eternal universe. In doing so, he proposed the modal theory of possible worlds, arguing that their actual world is the best of all possible worlds from among all the alternate timelines and world histories that God could have possibly created. His theory parallels that of Duns Scotus in the 14th century. While it is uncertain whether Al-Ghazali had any influence on Scotus, they both may have derived their theory from their readings of Avicenna's Metaphysics.

Multiversal cosmology

Fakhr al-Din al-Razi (1149–1209), in dealing with his conception of physics and the physical world in his Matalib al-'Aliya, criticizes the idea of the Earth's centrality within the universe and "explores the notion of the existence of a multiverse in the context of his commentary" on the Qur'anic verse, "All praise belongs to God, Lord of the Worlds." He raises the question of whether the term "worlds" in this verse refers to "multiple worlds within this single universe or cosmos, or to many other universes or a multiverse beyond this known universe." In volume 4 of the Matalib, Al-Razi states:

Al-Razi rejected the Aristotelian and Avicennian notions of a single universe revolving around a single world. He describes the main arguments against the existence of multiple worlds or universes, pointing out their weaknesses and refuting them. This rejection arose from his affirmation of atomism, as advocated by the Ash'ari school of Islamic theology, which entails the existence of vacant space in which the atoms move, combine and separate. He discussed in greater detail the void, the empty space between stars and constellations in the Universe, in volume 5 of the Matalib. He argued that there exists an infinite outer space beyond the known world, and that God has the power to fill the vacuum with an infinite number of universes.

Refutations of astrology

The study of astrology was refuted by several Muslim writers at the time, including al-Farabi, Ibn al-Haytham, Avicenna, Biruni and Averroes. Their reasons for refuting astrology were often due to both scientific (the methods used by astrologers being conjectural rather than empirical) and religious (conflicts with orthodox Islamic scholars) reasons.

Ibn Qayyim Al-Jawziyya (1292–1350), in his Miftah Dar al-SaCadah, used empirical arguments in astronomy in order to refute the practice of astrology and divination. He recognized that the stars are much larger than the planets, and thus argued:

Al-Jawziyya also recognized the Milky Way galaxy as "a myriad of tiny stars packed together in the sphere of the fixed stars" and thus argued that "it is certainly impossible to have knowledge of their influences."

Early heliocentric models

The Hellenistic Greek astronomer Seleucus of Seleucia, who advocated a heliocentric model in the 2nd century BC, wrote a work that was later translated into Arabic. A fragment of his work has survived only in Arabic translation, which was later referred to by the Persian philosopher Muhammad ibn Zakariya al-Razi (865–925).

In the late ninth century, Ja'far ibn Muhammad Abu Ma'shar al-Balkhi (Albumasar) developed a planetary model which some have interpreted as a heliocentric model. This is due to his orbital revolutions of the planets being given as heliocentric revolutions rather than geocentric revolutions, and the only known planetary theory in which this occurs is in the heliocentric theory. His work on planetary theory has not survived, but his astronomical data was later recorded by al-Hashimi, Abū Rayhān al-Bīrūnī and al-Sijzi.

In the early eleventh century, al-Biruni had met several Indian scholars who believed in a rotating earth. In his Indica, he discusses the theories on the Earth's rotation supported by Brahmagupta and other Indian astronomers, while in his Canon Masudicus, al-Biruni writes that Aryabhata's followers assigned the first movement from east to west to the Earth and a second movement from west to east to the fixed stars. Al-Biruni also wrote that al-Sijzi also believed the Earth was moving and invented an astrolabe called the "Zuraqi" based on this idea:

In his Indica, al-Biruni briefly refers to his work on the refutation of heliocentrism, the Key of Astronomy, which is now lost:

Early Hay'a program

During this period, a distinctive Islamic system of astronomy flourished.  It was Greek tradition to separate mathematical astronomy (as typified by Ptolemy) from philosophical cosmology (as typified by Aristotle). Muslim scholars developed a program of seeking a physically real configuration (hay'a) of the universe, that would be consistent with both mathematical and physical principles.  Within the context of this hay'a tradition, Muslim astronomers began questioning technical details of the Ptolemaic system of astronomy.

Some Muslim astronomers, however, most notably Abū Rayhān al-Bīrūnī and Nasīr al-Dīn al-Tūsī, discussed whether the Earth moved and considered how this might be consistent with astronomical computations and physical systems. Several other Muslim astronomers, most notably those following the Maragha school of astronomy, developed non-Ptolemaic planetary models within a geocentric context that were later adapted by the Copernican model in a heliocentric context.

Between 1025 and 1028, Ibn al-Haytham (Latinized as Alhazen), began the hay'a tradition of Islamic astronomy with his Al-Shuku ala Batlamyus (Doubts on Ptolemy). While maintaining the physical reality of the geocentric model, he was the first to criticize Ptolemy's astronomical system, which he criticized on empirical, observational and experimental grounds, and for relating actual physical motions to imaginary mathematical points, lines and circles. Ibn al-Haytham developed a physical structure of the Ptolemaic system in his Treatise on the configuration of the World, or Maqâlah fî hay'at al-‛âlam, which became an influential work in the hay'a tradition. In his Epitome of Astronomy, he insisted that the heavenly bodies "were accountable to the laws of physics."

In 1038, Ibn al-Haytham described the first non-Ptolemaic configuration in The Model of the Motions. His reform was not concerned with cosmology, as he developed a systematic study of celestial kinematics that was completely geometric. This in turn led to innovative developments in infinitesimal geometry. His reformed model was the first to reject the equant and eccentrics, separate natural philosophy from astronomy, free celestial kinematics from cosmology, and reduce physical entities to geometrical entities. The model also propounded the Earth's rotation about its axis, and the centres of motion were geometrical points without any physical significance, like Johannes Kepler's model centuries later. Ibn al-Haytham also describes an early version of Occam's razor, where he employs only minimal hypotheses regarding the properties that characterize astronomical motions, as he attempts to eliminate from his planetary model the cosmological hypotheses that cannot be observed from Earth.

In 1030, Abū al-Rayhān al-Bīrūnī discussed the Indian planetary theories of Aryabhata, Brahmagupta and Varahamihira in his Ta'rikh al-Hind (Latinized as Indica). Biruni stated that Brahmagupta and others consider that the earth rotates on its axis and Biruni noted that this does not create any mathematical problems. Abu Said al-Sijzi, a contemporary of al-Biruni, suggested the possible heliocentric movement of the Earth around the Sun, which al-Biruni did not reject. Al-Biruni agreed with the Earth's rotation about its own axis, and while he was initially neutral regarding the heliocentric and geocentric models, he considered heliocentrism to be a philosophical problem. He remarked that if the Earth rotates on its axis and moves around the Sun, it would remain consistent with his astronomical parameters:

Andalusian Revolt

In the 11th–12th centuries, astronomers in al-Andalus took up the challenge earlier posed by Ibn al-Haytham, namely to develop an alternate non-Ptolemaic configuration that evaded the errors found in the Ptolemaic model. Like Ibn al-Haytham's critique, the anonymous Andalusian work, al-Istidrak ala Batlamyus (Recapitulation regarding Ptolemy), included a list of objections to Ptolemic astronomy. This marked the beginning of the Andalusian school's revolt against Ptolemaic astronomy, otherwise known as the "Andalusian Revolt".

In the 12th century, Averroes rejected the eccentric deferents introduced by Ptolemy. He rejected the Ptolemaic model and instead argued for a strictly concentric model of the universe. He wrote the following criticism on the Ptolemaic model of planetary motion:

Averroes' contemporary, Maimonides, wrote the following on the planetary model proposed by Ibn Bajjah (Avempace):

Ibn Bajjah also proposed the Milky Way galaxy to be made up of many stars but that it appears to be a continuous image due to the effect of refraction in the Earth's atmosphere. Later in the 12th century, his successors Ibn Tufail and Nur Ed-Din Al Betrugi (Alpetragius) were the first to propose planetary models without any equant, epicycles or eccentrics. Their configurations, however, were not accepted due to the numerical predictions of the planetary positions in their models being less accurate than that of the Ptolemaic model, mainly because they followed Aristotle's notion of perfectly uniform circular motion.

Maragha Revolution

The "Maragha Revolution" refers to the Maragheh school's revolution against Ptolemaic astronomy. The "Maragha school" was an astronomical tradition beginning in the Maragheh observatory and continuing with astronomers from Damascus and Samarkand. Like their Andalusian predecessors, the Maragha astronomers attempted to solve the equant problem and produce alternative configurations to the Ptolemaic model. They were more successful than their Andalusian predecessors in producing non-Ptolemaic configurations which eliminated the equant and eccentrics, were more accurate than the Ptolemaic model in numerically predicting planetary positions, and were in better agreement with empirical observations. The most important of the Maragha astronomers included Mo'ayyeduddin Urdi (d. 1266), Nasīr al-Dīn al-Tūsī (1201–1274), Najm al-Dīn al-Qazwīnī al-Kātibī (d. 1277), Qutb al-Din al-Shirazi (1236–1311), Sadr al-Sharia al-Bukhari (c. 1347), Ibn al-Shatir (1304–1375), Ali Qushji (c. 1474), al-Birjandi (d. 1525) and Shams al-Din al-Khafri (d. 1550).

Some have described their achievements in the 13th and 14th centuries as a "Maragha Revolution", "Maragha School Revolution", or "Scientific Revolution before the Renaissance".  An important aspect of this revolution included the realization that astronomy should aim to describe the behavior of physical bodies in mathematical language, and should not remain a mathematical hypothesis, which would only save the phenomena. The Maragha astronomers also realized that the Aristotelian view of motion in the universe being only circular or linear was not true, as the Tusi-couple showed that linear motion could also be produced by applying circular motions only.

Unlike the ancient Greek and Hellenistic astronomers who were not concerned with the coherence between the mathematical and physical principles of a planetary theory, Islamic astronomers insisted on the need to match the mathematics with the real world surrounding them, which gradually evolved from a reality based on Aristotelian physics to one based on an empirical and mathematical physics after the work of Ibn al-Shatir. The Maragha Revolution was thus characterized by a shift away from the philosophical foundations of Aristotelian cosmology and Ptolemaic astronomy and towards a greater emphasis on the empirical observation and mathematization of astronomy and of nature in general, as exemplified in the works of Ibn al-Shatir, Qushji, al-Birjandi and al-Khafri.

Other achievements of the Maragha school include the first empirical observational evidence for the Earth's rotation on its axis by al-Tusi and Qushji, the separation of natural philosophy from astronomy by Ibn al-Shatir and Qushji, the rejection of the Ptolemaic model on empirical rather than philosophical grounds by Ibn al-Shatir, and the development of a non-Ptolemaic model by Ibn al-Shatir that was mathematically identical to the heliocentric Copernical model.

Mo'ayyeduddin Urdi (d. 1266)  was the first of the Maragheh astronomers to develop a non-Ptolemaic model, and he proposed a new theorem, the "Urdi lemma". Nasīr al-Dīn al-Tūsī (1201–1274) resolved significant problems in the Ptolemaic system by developing the Tusi-couple as an alternative to the physically problematic equant introduced by Ptolemy. Tusi's student Qutb al-Din al-Shirazi (1236–1311), in his The Limit of Accomplishment concerning Knowledge of the Heavens, discussed the possibility of heliocentrism. Al-Qazwīnī al-Kātibī, who also worked at the Maragheh observatory, in his Hikmat al-'Ain, wrote an argument for a heliocentric model, though he later abandoned the idea.

Ibn al-Shatir (1304–1375) of Damascus, in A Final Inquiry Concerning the Rectification of Planetary Theory, incorporated the Urdi lemma, and eliminated the need for an equant by introducing an extra epicycle (the Tusi-couple), departing from the Ptolemaic system in a way that was mathematically identical to what Nicolaus Copernicus did in the 16th century. Unlike previous astronomers before him, Ibn al-Shatir was not concerned with adhering to the theoretical principles of natural philosophy or Aristotelian cosmology, but rather to produce a model that was more consistent with empirical observations. For example, it was Ibn al-Shatir's concern for observational accuracy which led him to eliminate the epicycle in the Ptolemaic solar model and all the eccentrics, epicycles and equant in the Ptolemaic lunar model. His model was thus in better agreement with empirical observations than any previous model, and was also the first that permitted empirical testing. His work thus marked a turning point in astronomy, which may be considered a "Scientific Revolution before the Renaissance". His rectified model was later adapted into a heliocentric model by Copernicus, which was mathematically achieved by reversing the direction of the last vector connecting the Earth to the Sun.

An area of active discussion in the Maragheh school, and later the Samarkand and Istanbul observatories, was the possibility of the Earth's rotation. Supporters of this theory included Nasīr al-Dīn al-Tūsī, Nizam al-Din al-Nisaburi (c. 1311), al-Sayyid al-Sharif al-Jurjani (1339–1413), Ali Qushji (d. 1474), and Abd al-Ali al-Birjandi (d. 1525). Al-Tusi was the first to present empirical observational evidence of the Earth's rotation, using the location of comets relevant to the Earth as evidence, which Qushji elaborated on with further empirical observations while rejecting Aristotelian natural philosophy altogether. Both of their arguments were similar to the arguments later used by Nicolaus Copernicus in 1543 to explain the Earth's rotation (see Astronomical physics and Earth's motion section below).

Experimental astrophysics and celestial mechanics
In the 9th century, the eldest Banū Mūsā brother, Ja'far Muhammad ibn Mūsā ibn Shākir, made significant contributions to Islamic astrophysics and celestial mechanics. He was the first to hypothesize that the heavenly bodies and celestial spheres are subject to the same laws of physics as Earth, unlike the ancients who believed that the celestial spheres followed their own set of physical laws different from that of Earth. In his Astral Motion and The Force of Attraction, Muhammad ibn Musa also proposed that there is a force of attraction between heavenly bodies, foreshadowing Newton's law of universal gravitation.

In the early 11th century, Ibn al-Haytham (Alhazen) wrote the Maqala fi daw al-qamar (On the Light of the Moon) some time before 1021. This was the first attempt successful at combining mathematical astronomy with physics and the earliest attempt at applying the experimental method to astronomy and astrophysics. He disproved the universally held opinion that the moon reflects sunlight like a mirror and correctly concluded that it "emits light from those portions of its surface which the sun's light strikes." In order to prove that "light is emitted from every point of the moon's illuminated surface," he built an "ingenious experimental device." Ibn al-Haytham had "formulated a clear conception of the relationship between an ideal mathematical model and the complex of observable phenomena; in particular, he was the first to make a systematic use of the method of varying the experimental conditions in a constant and uniform manner, in an experiment showing that the intensity of the light-spot formed by the projection of the moonlight through two small apertures onto a screen diminishes constantly as one of the apertures is gradually blocked up."

Ibn al-Haytham, in his Book of Optics (1021), was also the first to discover that the celestial spheres do not consist of solid matter, and he also discovered that the heavens are less dense than the air. These views were later repeated by Witelo and had a significant influence on the Copernican and Tychonic systems of astronomy.

In the 12th century, Fakhr al-Din al-Razi participated in the debate among Islamic scholars over whether the celestial spheres or orbits (falak) are "to be considered as real, concrete physical bodies" or "merely the abstract circles in the heavens traced out year in and year out by the various stars and planets." He points out that many astronomers prefer to see them as solid spheres "on which the stars turn," while others, such as the Islamic scholar Dahhak, view the celestial sphere as "not a body but merely the abstract orbit traced by the stars." Al-Razi himself remains "undecided as to which celestial models, concrete or abstract, most conform with external reality," and notes that "there is no way to ascertain the characteristics of the heavens," whether by "observable" evidence or by authority (al-khabar) of "divine revelation or prophetic traditions." He concludes that "astronomical models, whatever their utility or lack thereof for ordering the heavens, are not founded on sound rational proofs, and so no intellectual commitment can be made to them insofar as description and explanation of celestial realities are concerned."

The theologian Adud al-Din al-Iji (1281–1355), under the influence of the Ash'ari doctrine of occasionalism, which maintained that all physical effects were caused directly by God's will rather than by natural causes, rejected the Aristotelian principle of an innate principle of circular motion in the heavenly bodies, and maintained that the celestial spheres were "imaginary things" and "more tenuous than a spider's web". His views were challenged by al-Jurjani (1339–1413), who argued that even if the celestial spheres "do not have an external reality, yet they are things that are correctly imagined and correspond to what [exists] in actuality".

Astronomical physics and Earth's motion

The work of Ali Qushji (d. 1474), who worked at Samarkand and then Istanbul, is seen as a late example of innovation in Islamic theoretical astronomy and it is believed he may have possibly had some influence on Nicolaus Copernicus due to similar arguments concerning the Earth's rotation. Before Qushji, the only astronomer to present empirical evidence for the Earth's rotation was Nasīr al-Dīn al-Tūsī (d. 1274), who used the phenomena of comets to refute Ptolemy's claim that a stationary Earth can be determined through observation. Al-Tusi, however, eventually accepted that the Earth was stationary on the basis of Aristotelian cosmology and natural philosophy. By the 15th century, the influence of Aristotelian physics and natural philosophy was declining due to religious opposition from Islamic theologians such as Al-Ghazali who opposed to the interference of Aristotelianism in astronomy, opening up possibilities for an astronomy unrestrained by philosophy. Under this influence, Qushji, in his Concerning the Supposed Dependence of Astronomy upon Philosophy, rejected Aristotelian physics and completely separated natural philosophy from astronomy, allowing astronomy to become a purely empirical and mathematical science. This allowed him to explore alternatives to the Aristotelian notion of a stationary Earth, as he explored the idea of a moving Earth. He also observed comets and elaborated on al-Tusi's argument. He took it a step further and concluded, on the basis of empirical evidence rather than speculative philosophy, that the moving Earth theory is just as likely to be true as the stationary Earth theory and that it is not possible to empirically deduce which theory is true. His work was an important step away from Aristotelian physics and towards an independent astronomical physics.

Despite the similarity in their discussions regarding the Earth's motion, there is uncertainty over whether Qushji had any influence on Copernicus. However, it is likely that they both may have arrived at similar conclusions due to using the earlier work of al-Tusi as a basis. This is more of a possibility considering "the remarkable coincidence between a passage in De revolutionibus (I.8) and one in Ṭūsī’s Tadhkira (II.1[6]) in which Copernicus follows Ṭūsī’s objection to Ptolemy’s “proofs” of the Earth's immobility." This can be considered as evidence that not only was Copernicus influenced by the mathematical models of Islamic astronomers, but may have also been influenced by the astronomical physics they began developing and their views on the Earth's motion.

In the 16th century, the debate on the Earth's motion was continued by al-Birjandi (d. 1528), who in his analysis of what might occur if the Earth were moving, develops a hypothesis similar to Galileo Galilei's notion of "circular inertia", which he described in the following observational test (as a response to one of Qutb al-Din al-Shirazi's arguments):

See also
 Sufi cosmology
 Astronomy in the medieval Islamic world
 Bahá'í cosmology
 Buddhist cosmology
 Christian cosmology
 Hindu cosmology
 Jain cosmology
 Religious cosmology
 Arcs of Descent and Ascent

Notes

References
Ali, Maulana Muhammad, The Holy Qur'an: Text, 

Daryabadi, Abdul Majid (1941), The Holy Qur'an, English Translation, 57, Lahore

Nasr, Seyyed Hossein (1993), An Introduction to Islamic Cosmological Doctrines: Conceptions of Nature and Methods Used for Its Study by the Ikhwan Al-Safa, Al-Biruni, and Ibn Sina, State University of New York Press
 1st edition 1964, 2nd edition 1993.
Pickthall, Marmaduke, The Glorious Qu'ran,

External links
The Quran and Cosmology
Dr Israr Ahmed 

Islam and science